The North Coast Casket Company Building was a building located in Everett, Washington listed on the National Register of Historic Places.  The building was built in 1926 when William G. Humbert added a casket production building for his mill.  It had been known as the North Coast Casket Company Building and the Collins Building.

While the building was placed on the National Register of Historical Places in 2006, costs made the building's renovations impractical.  The building was deconstructed in 2010.

See also
 National Register of Historic Places listings in Snohomish County, Washington

References

External links
 

Industrial buildings and structures on the National Register of Historic Places in Washington (state)
1926 establishments in Washington (state)
Industrial buildings completed in 1926
National Register of Historic Places in Everett, Washington
Coffins
Funeral-related companies